This is a list of nuclear medicine societies worldwide, mentioned in SNM and/or in EANM.

 American Society of Nuclear Cardiology (ASNC)
 Armenian College of Nuclear Medicine (ACNM)
 Arab Society of Nuclear Medicine  (ARSNM)
 Asia Oceania Federation of Nuclear Medicine and Biology (AOFNMB)
 Asian Regional Cooperative Council for Nuclear Medicine (ARCCNM)
 Asociación Latinoamericana de Sociedades de Biología y Medicina Nuclear (ALASBIMN)
 Associação Portuguesa de Técnicos de Medicina Nuclear (APTMN)
 Associazione Italiana di Medicina Nucleare
 Australian and New Zealand Association of Physicians in Nuclear Medicine (ANZAPNM)
 Australia-New Zealand Society of Nuclear Medicine (ANZSNM)
 Austrian Society of Nuclear Medicine
 Belgian Society of Nuclear Medicine (BELNUC)
 Bosnian Society of Nuclear Medicine
 Brazilian Society of Biology and Nuclear Medicine
 British Nuclear Medicine Society (BNMS)
 British Nuclear Cardiology Society (BNCS)
 Bulgarian Society of Nuclear Medicine
 Canadian Association of Nuclear Medicine (CANM)
 Chinese Society of Nuclear Medicine (CSNM)
 Colegio Internacional de Médicos Nucleares (ICNP) (Mexico)
 Croatian Society of Nuclear Medicine
 Cyprus Society of Nuclear Medicine
 Czech Society of Nuclear Medicine (ČSNM)
 Dansk Selskab For Klinisk Fysiologi og Nuklear Medicin
 Deutsche Gesellschaft für Nuklearmedizin
 Dutch Society of Nuclear Medicine (NVNG)
 Egyptian Society of Nuclear Medicine Specialists (ESNMS)
 Estonian Nuclear Medicine Society (ENMS)
 European Association of Nuclear Medicine (EANM)
 Federación Mexicana de Medicina Nuclear e Imagen Molecular (FMMNIM)
 Finnish Society of Nuclear Medicine (FSNM)
 French Society of Nuclear Medicine
 Hellenic Society of Nuclear Medicine
 Hellenic Society of Nuclear Medicine & Molecular Imaging
 Hong Kong Society of Nuclear Medicine
 Icelandic Society of Nuclear Medicine
 Iranian Society of Nuclear Medicine
 Irish Nuclear Medicine Association (INMA)
 Israeli Society of Nuclear Medicine (ISNM)
 Japan Society for Molecular Imaging
 Japanese Society of Nuclear Medicine
 Jordanian Society of Nuclear Medicine (JOSNM)
 Korean Society of Nuclear Medicine (KSNM)
 Kuwait Society of Nuclear Medicine and Molecular Imaging (KSNMMI)
 Latvian Association of Radiologist (LRA)
 Lithuanian Society of Nuclear Medicine
 National Society of Nuclear Medicine of the Republic of Kazakhstan
 Nigerian Association of Nuclear Medicine
 Norwegian Society of Nuclear Medicine and Molecular Imaging (NSNM)
 Nuclear Cardiological Society of India (NCSI)
 Nuclear Medicine Society of Tajikistan
 Pakistan Society of Nuclear Medicine (PSNM)
 Philippines National Society of Nuclear Medicine (PSNM)
 Polish Society of Nuclear Medicine
 Romanian Society of Nuclear Medicine (SRNM)
 Russian Society of Nuclear Medicine (RSNM)
 Serbian Nuclear Medicine Society (UNMS)
 Slovak Society of Nuclear Medicine and Radiation Hygiene (SSNM&RH)
 Sociedade Portugesa de Medicina Nuclear (SPMN)
 Society of Nuclear Medicine and Molecular Imaging (SNMMI)
 Society of Nuclear Medicine Bangladesh
 Society of Nuclear Medicine India
 South African Society of Nuclear Medicine
 Spanish Society of Nuclear Medicine (SEMN)
 Swedish Society of Nuclear Medicine
 Swiss Society of Nuclear Medicine (SSMN)
 Tunisian Society of Nuclear Medicine (STMN)
 Turkish Society of Nuclear Medicine
 Ukrainian Society of Nuclear Medicine (USNM)
 World Federation of Nuclear Medicine & Biology (WFNMB)

References 

Nuclear Medicine
Nuclear medicine organizations